Crazy Day or The Marriage of Figaro is a modern comedy musical staged by television channels «NTV» (Russia) and «Inter» (Ukraine) in association with «Melorama Production», under direction of Semen Gorov in 2003, based on the 1784 Pierre Beaumarchais' play The Marriage of Figaro. The musical was aired for the first time on the New Year's night of 2004.

Plot
The day before his wedding, handsome and merry Figaro, played by Boris Hvoshnyansky, learns of the bride Susanna (Anastasia Stotskaya), but he has a rival - voluptuous Count Almaviva, played by Philip Kirkorov. Earl intends to use the old right of the first night in his possessions and to steal from the lovers their happiness. The case becomes more complicated as another lover - Marceline (Sofia Rotaru) claims her love for Figaro as well, requiring a considerable amount of money to return and marry her. Figaro uses infinitely jealousy count to his wife Rosine, played in the movie by Lolita Miliavskaya. The reason for the jealousy becomes innocent infatuation by Kerubino young countess' page, who played by Andrei Danilko. A whole series of changing, humorous situations and misunderstandings leads finally to all the love and harmony. Figaro gets his parents and wife. The Earl once again loves his Rosine, as small Cherubin successfully avoided serving in the army.

Cast
Philipp Kirkorov as Count Almaviva
Lolita Milyavskaya as Countess Rosine
Boris Khoshnyansky as Figaro
Anastasiya Stotskaya as Suzanne
Sofia Rotaru as Marceline
Boris Moiseev as Antonio the gardener
Ani Lorak as Fanchette
Andriy Danylko as Cherubin
Vitaly Linetsky as Bazile
Vladimir Goryansky as Don Guzman Brid'Oison (judge)

References

External links 
RussArt.com (Russian)
Kinoexpert (Russian)
Film description (Russian)

Russian television films
2004 television films
2004 films
Russian films based on plays
Russian musical films
2000s musical films
2000s Russian-language films